Two's Company may refer to:

Film and TV
Two's Company (film), a 1936 British film
Two's Company (musical), a 1952 American musical starring Bette Davis
Two's Company (British TV series), a British television situation comedy series (1975–1979)
Two's Company (Australian TV series), an Australian television variety series (1959-1961)

Music
Two's Company (Maynard Ferguson and Chris Connor album), a 1961 album byMaynard Ferguson and Chris Connor album
Two's Company (Joe Albany and Niels-Henning Ørsted Pedersen album), a 1974 jazz album by Joe Albany and Niels-Henning Ørsted Pedersen
Two's Company (Cliff Richard album), a 2006 album of Cliff Richard in a set of 14 duets with major artists